Dillon Lake is a reservoir in Muskingum County, Ohio in the United States. It was completed in 1961, covers 1,736 acres of water and was constructed primarily for flood control purposes. The lake was named after Moses Dillon, who purchased the land in 1803/1804

References 

Bodies of water of Muskingum County, Ohio